The 1930 Giro di Lombardia was the 26th edition of the Giro di Lombardia cycle race and was held on 26 October 1930, over a course of . The race started and finished in Milan.

124 cyclists departed from Milan and 46 of them completed the race.

General classification

References

External links
 Web oficial de la carrera ((in Italian))
 El Sitio de Ciclismo
 
 Resultados a Les-Sports.info

1930
Giro di Lombardia
Giro di Lombardia